Armand Camille Salacrou (9 August 1899 – 23 November 1989) was a French dramatist.

Biography
He was born in Rouen, but spent most of his childhood at Le Havre, and moved to Paris in 1917. His first works show the influence of the Surrealists.

He was the owner of a profitable advertising firm, but sold it in order to devote his time to writing plays. Encouraged by Charles Dullin, he wrote in a wide range of styles and enjoyed great success from the mid-1930s. His later work is usually grouped with that of the Existentialists. He flirted with communism during the 1920s and criticized capitalism in his play Boulevard Durand. During the Nazi occupation of France, he participated in the clandestine French resistance, an experience which he celebrated in Les Nuits de la colère.

He was a member of the Académie Goncourt, and a library in his home town is named after him.

Plays

 1923 : Magasin d'accessoires, Histoire de cirque, Le Casseur d'assiettes, Les Trente Tombes de Judas
 1924 : La Boule de Verre
 1925 : Le Pont de l'Europe
 1925 : Tour à terre
 1927 : Patchouli, ou Les Désordres de l'amour
 1929 : Atlas-Hôtel, Les Frénétiques
 1931 : La Vie en Rose
 1933 : Une femme libre, Poof
 1935 : L'Inconnue d'Arras
 1936 : Un homme comme les autres
 1937 : La terre est ronde
 1939 : Histoire de rire
 1941 : La Marguerite
 1944 : Les Fiancés du Havre
 1945 : Le Soldat et la sorcière
 1946 : Les Nuits de la colère
 1946 : L'Archipel Lenoir, ou Il ne faut pas toucher aux choses inutiles, Pourquoi pas moi?
 1950 : Dieu le savait, ou la Vie n'est pas sérieuse
 1952 : Sens Interdit, ou Les Âges de la Vie
 1953 : Les Invités du Bon Dieu
 1953 : Une femme trop honnête, ou Tout est dans la façon de le dire
 1954 : Le Miroir
 1959 : Boulevard Durand
 1964 : Comme les Chardons
 1966 : La Rue Noire

Bibliography
 J. van den Esch. Armand Salacrou, dramaturge de l'angoisse. Paris, 1947
 David Looseley. A Search for Commitment: the Theatre of Armand Salacrou. University of Exeter, 1985.
 Juris Silenieks. Themes and Dramatic Forms in the Plays of Armand Salacrou. University of Nebraska, Lincoln, 1967.
 Fiorenza di Franco. Le théâtre de Salacrou. Gallimard, Paris, 1970.
 Annie Ubersfeld. Armand Salacrou. Seghers, Paris, 1970.
 Philippe Bébon. Salacrou. Éditions universitaires, Paris, 1971.

References

Writers from Le Havre
1899 births
1989 deaths
French Resistance members
20th-century French dramatists and playwrights